Leeuwergem is a village belonging to the municipality of Zottegem. It is located on the Molenbeek, in the Denderstreek and Flemish Ardennes, which is part of the hilly southern part of the East Flanders province, Belgium.

Leeuwergem used to be part of the heerlijkheid of Zottegem. From 1271 onwards, it formed a heerlijkheid with Massemen. It was an independent municipality until 1970, when it was merged into Zottegem.

Leeuwergem and the neighbouring village of Elene host the 18th century Leeuwergem Castle domain, a private estate of 32 hectares.

Gallery

References

External links 
 
Webpage about Leeuwergem Castle at Internet Archives

Zottegem
Populated places in East Flanders